Charles Gordon Gross (February 29, 1936 – April 13, 2019) was a professor of psychology and a neuroscientist who studied the sensory processing and pattern recognition in the cerebral cortex of macaque monkeys. He spent 43 years of his career at Princeton University. He was born in Brooklyn, New York, and received his A.B. in 1957 from Harvard University and his Ph.D. from the University of Cambridge in 1961. Afterward, he went on to work at the Massachusetts Institute of Technology, where he conducted pioneering research on the visual cortex of monkeys. Gross made many important discoveries in his career, including the finding that neurons in the inferior temporal cortex (ITC) are selectively activated by complex objects and the discovery of "face cells," neurons that are specifically activated by the sight of faces. He also discovered hand-selective neurons in the macaque cerebral cortex in 1969. Gross's work on the ITC and face perception was groundbreaking and helped to establish the field of neuroscience. He was recognized for his contributions with numerous awards and honors, including being named a Fellow of the American Academy of Arts and Sciences.

References 

1936 births
2019 deaths
Harvard University alumni
Alumni of the University of Cambridge
Princeton University faculty
American neuroscientists
21st-century American psychologists
Scientists from Brooklyn
Fellows of the American Academy of Arts and Sciences
Place of death missing